State Property Fund of Ukraine is a central body of executive power with special status and being administrated by the Cabinet of Ukraine.

History 
State Property Fund of Ukraine was established in 1991 according to the Cabinet of Ministers' Resolution N.158 for the purpose of the implementation of the state policy of the privatization of state property. The activities of the Fund is regulated by the "Law on the State Property Fund of Ukraine" adopted in December 2011.

Directors
 1991-1994 Volodymyr Pryadko
 1994-1997 Yuriy Yekhanurov
 1997-1998 Volodymyr Lanovy (acting)
 1998-2003 Oleksandr Bondar
 2003-2005 Mykhailo Chechetov
 2005-2008 Valentyna Semenyuk-Samsonenko
 2008-2010 Dmytro Parfenenko (acting)
 2010-2014 Oleksandr Ryabchenko
 2014-2015 Dmytro Parfenenko (acting)
 2015-2017 Ihor Bilous
 2017 Dmytro Parfenenko (acting)
 2017-2019 Vitaliy Trubarov (acting)
 2019-2022 Dmytro Sennychenko
 2022 Olha Batova (acting)
 2022-present Rustem Umerov

Facts
At least two former directors of the State Property Fund committed suicide (Mykhailo Chechetov and Valentyna Semenyuk-Samsonenko) after the events of Euromaidan and after the former President of Ukraine Viktor Yanukovych left the country.

References

External links
 Official website

Independent agencies of the Ukrainian government
Presidency of Ukraine